The City of Fitzroy was a local government area about  northeast of Melbourne, the state capital of Victoria, Australia.

History

In 1850, the area was made the Fitzroy Ward of the City of Melbourne, and on 10 September 1858, the ward was severed and Fitzroy was incorporated as a municipality. It became a borough on 1 October 1865, a town on 3 December 1870, and a city on 1 February 1878. Many public buildings were erected at this time, with the free public library, one of the first in Melbourne, being erected in 1877, and a courthouse in 1888.

During the mid-1920s, there was a strong move to have the Fitzroy municipality amalgamate with the City of Melbourne. Three referendums on the matter were held in the space of 18 months: on 24 June and 20 August 1926, and 24 November 1927. In each case, ratepayers voted in favour of amalgamation, but a determined rearguard action by councillors opposed to the merger meant that no change occurred.

On 22 June 1994, the City of Fitzroy was abolished, and along with the Cities of Collingwood and Richmond, and parts of Fairfield and Alphington from the City of Northcote, was merged into the newly created City of Yarra.

Council meetings were held at the Fitzroy Town Hall, in Napier Street, Fitzroy. The hall is still used for this purpose and as a municipal library for the City of Yarra.

Mayors

Wards

Fitzroy was historically divided into five wards, each electing three councillors. However, on 25 November 1986, the wards were reduced from five to three:
 North Ward
 Clifton Ward
 South Ward

Suburbs
 Fitzroy*
 Fitzroy North
 Carlton North (shared with the City of Melbourne)

* Council seat.

Population

* Estimate in the 1958 Victorian Year Book.

References

External links
 Victorian Places - Fitzroy

Fitzroy
Fitzroy, Victoria
City of Yarra
1858 establishments in Australia
1994 disestablishments in Australia